Colorado County is a county located in the U.S. state of Texas. As of the 2020 census, its population was 20,557. Its county seat is Columbus. It is named for the Colorado River of Texas. The county was founded in 1836 and organized the next year.

History 
The territory that is now Colorado County has been continually inhabited by humans for at least 12,000 years. The Coco branch of the Karaknawa are said to have hunted in the area, while Tonkawa crossed the area from the south.

The first record of an Anglo settler coming through the area that is now Colorado County was January 20, 1687, when René Robert Cavelier, Sieur de La Salle, camped along Skull Creek. The party located an Indian village and named it Hebemes. The fourth expedition of Alonso De León may have crossed into the area while looking for Fort St. Louis in 1689.

The area was settled by Anglo colonists who were part of Stephen F. Austin's Old Three Hundred starting in 1821. Some families settled near Beeson's Ford, a few miles south of Columbus' present day location. The area was active during the days of the Texas Revolution. Dilue Rose Harris wrote her memoir of the Runaway Scrape from within the boundaries of Colorado County.

The county was one of the original Republic of Texas counties when it formed in 1836. Following the American Civil War, the county had one of the larger populations of African-American freedmen in the state, and was granted a Freedmen's Bureau office in Columbus.

Many European settlers, particularly Germans, as well as Moravians and Bohemians from what became Czechoslovakia, began to settle in the county after the Civil War, although Germans had settled in the area as early as 1830.

Geography

Major highways
  Interstate 10
  U.S. Highway 90
  U.S. Highway 90 Alternate
  State Highway 71

Adjacent counties
 Austin County (northeast)
 Wharton County (southeast)
 Jackson County (south)
 Lavaca County (southwest)
 Fayette County (northwest)

National protected area
 Attwater Prairie Chicken National Wildlife Refuge

Demographics

Note: the US Census treats Hispanic/Latino as an ethnic category. This table excludes Latinos from the racial categories and assigns them to a separate category. Hispanics/Latinos can be of any race.

As of the census of 2000, 20,390 people, 7,641 households, and 5,402 families were residing in the county.  The population density was 21 people/sq mi (8/km2).  The 9,431 housing units averaged 10/sq mi (4/km2).  The racial makeup of the county was 72.79% White, 14.80% African American, 0.37% Native American, 0.21% Asian, 10.06% from other races, and 1.78% from two or more races. About 19.74% of the population were Hispanics or Latinos of any race.

Of the 7,641 households, 31.1% had children under 18 living with them, 56.3% were married couples living together, 10.9% had a female householder with no husband present, and 29.3% were not families. About 26.2% of all households were made up of individuals, and 14.4% had someone living alone who was 65 or older.  The average household size was 2.56, and the average family size was 3.08.

In the county, the age distribution was 25.6% under 18, 8.9% from 18 to 24, 23.8% from 25 to 44, 23.1% from 45 to 64, and % who were 65  or older.  The median age was 39 years. For every 100 females, there were 95.30 males.  For every 100 females age 18 and over, there were 92.40 males.

The median income for a household in the county was $32,425, and for a family was $41,388. Males had a median income of $30,063 versus $20,014 for females. The per capita income for the county was $16,910.  About 12.3% of families and 16.2% of the population were below the poverty line, including 21.0% of those under age 18 and 15.80% of those age 65 or over.

Communities

Cities
 Columbus (county seat)
 Eagle Lake
 Weimar

Census-designated place
 Glidden

Unincorporated communities

 Alleyton
 Altair
 Bernardo
 Borden
 Chesterville
 Frelsburg
 Garwood
 Matthews
 Mentz
 Nada
 Oakland
 Rock Island
 Sheridan

Ghost towns
 Osage
 Pisek
 Provident City

Politics
Like many southern counties, Colorado County was predominantly Democratic prior to the 1960s and predominantly Republican since then.  The last Democrat to carry the state was Jimmy Carter in 1976; George W. Bush, Mitt Romney and Donald Trump all received more than 70 percent of the vote in the county.

See also

 List of museums in East Texas
 National Register of Historic Places listings in Colorado County, Texas
 Recorded Texas Historic Landmarks in Colorado County

References

External links

 Colorado County government’s website
 Colorado County in Handbook of Texas Online at the University of Texas
 Weimar Information and Events
  Columbus Information and Events

 
1837 establishments in the Republic of Texas
Populated places established in 1837